"Indian Summer" is a 1983 song by English pop/new wave band The Belle Stars, released as the fifth and final single from their only self-titled studio album and their ninth single overall. The song peaked at #52 for three weeks.

Background
"Indian Summer" is a song about a lover had for a day. The song's chorus: "We were lovers for a day; never again will it ever be that way" likely talks about how the band only had one hit. Many of the band also believed that the single caused a rivalry with Bananarama's "Cruel Summer".

Music video
The music video of the song depicts the band in a casino. The band wears oriental-esque clothing and they later go diving in a pool. Throughout the video, men are shown socializing with the band and laying back.

References

1983 singles
The Belle Stars songs
1983 songs
Stiff Records singles
Song articles with missing songwriters
Song recordings produced by Peter Collins (record producer)